Songs of Europe is a concert television programme commemorating the Eurovision Song Contest's twenty-fifth anniversary. The event was held in Mysen, Norway in 1981, featuring all but eight of the winners of the Eurovision Song Contest from its first edition in 1956 to 1981, and broadcast to more than 100 million viewers all over Europe.

The concert, which was the largest ever in Norway at the time, and still the largest in Mysen, was hosted by Norwegian television personalities Rolf Kirkvaag and children's television character Titten Tei, who led the two-hour live broadcast in English, German, French, Norwegian and Spanish. The majority of entries were conducted by Sigurd Jansen, although the song "Hallelujah" was conducted, as it was in 1979, by composer Kobi Oshrat. "Nous les amoureux" was conducted by Raymond Bernard, "La, la, la" by Manuel Gas, and "Boom Bang-a-Bang" by Kenny Clayton.

Background
The concert was an annual fund raiser for the International Red Cross, with previous headline acts including Julie Andrews, Charles Aznavour and in 1975, Eurovision winners ABBA.

The theme of the Eurovision winning songs was chosen for the 1981 edition, with a double-album containing all 29 winning tracks released by the Red Cross imprinted on their own label to raise additional funding, entitled Eurovision Gala: 29 Winners - 29 Worldsuccesses.

It is the biggest concert arranged to feature such an amount of Eurovision Song Contest artists and more specifically winners performing at once, with 21 out of a total 29 winners (four winners in the 1969 Contest) attending to perform their past winning songs; that is with the Eurovision Song Contest's fiftieth anniversary, Congratulations: 50 Years of the Eurovision Song Contest, featuring most of the artists as guests and not as performers, and the Contest's sixtieth anniversary, Eurovision Song Contest's Greatest Hits, featuring fifteen artists acts.

The show
Heavy rain delayed the start of the concert and interrupted some of the early performances. The songs were performed on the stage or shown in videos, in accordance to the chronological order of the Eurovision Song Contest's winners from the first edition in 1956 up to and including the 1981 edition; although 1981 was the 26th edition, it was held a few months prior to the concert and thus included in it.

Some snippets of earlier ESC performances intermingled into the show. 21 acts performed their winning songs live (although Dana lip-synched her winning song, as she was recovering from throat surgery), including three out of the four winners of the 1969 Contest. The remaining eight winners, marked in light red, were shown in video footage of their performances in their respective editions of the Eurovision Song Contest, where available. Others were shown in still photographs or in clips taken from other broadcasts where no clip from the contest was known to exist. Abba's performance of Waterloo was taken from the televised Red Cross concert the group had performed in Mysen in 1975. Waterloo was the only one of the absentee winning songs performed in its entirety.

Massiel performed a new, extended arrangement of her 1968 winning song, losing her timing and was briefly out of synch with the live orchestra. Martin Lee of Brotherhood of Man fumbled the lyrics of the 1976 winning song, repeating the first verse twice. Despite the rain and the wet stage, Sandie Shaw performed bare foot much to the appreciation of the audience.

The show ended with all of the performers and guest Teddy Scholten appearing on stage for a curtain call and photographs.

International broadcasting
In the United Kingdom, a highlights programme was broadcast by BBC Two on 25 September 1981 and introduced by Terry Wogan. BBC Radio 2 transmitted the concert on 26 December 1981, introduced by Len Jackson.

Commentators
The following countries, listed in order of broadcasting dates, had confirmed that they would broadcast the anniversary show.

Non-broadcasting countries
The following countries originally intended to broadcast the event, but withdrew for unknown reasons

The following list of countries, which participated in the Eurovision Song Contest at least once, also did not broadcast the show:

Official album 

Eurovision Gala: 29 Winners - 29 Worldsuccesses (also known as 25 Years Eurovision Song Contest Winners 1956-1981) is a compilation album with the first 29 winners of the Eurovision Song Contest. The album was released in the summer of 1981 in connection with the competition's 25th anniversary show. The first final took place in 1956, and it was thus 25 years since the competition started. However, the final in 1981 was the 26th in a row, and in 1969 there were four winners, so the total number of winners was 29 at this time.

The album cover featured the flags of the 13 nations that had won the contest to date, plus colour photographs of 10 of the winning artists: Jacqueline Boyer, Jean-Claude Pascal, Udo Jürgens, Sandie Shaw, Séverine, Vicky Leandros, ABBA, Milk and Honey with Gali Atari, Johnny Logan and Bucks Fizz, despite Leandros, ABBA and Atari not participating in the live concert. Inside the gatefold sleeve, monochrome photographs of all the winners were printed, with full details of the winning song (date, host city, author, composer, conductor, singer).

For the album release, a newly recorded version with a new arrangement of the 1966 winner by Udo Jürgens was included rather than the original version that won the contest. Additionally, the English versions of both the Israeli winners of 1978 and 1979 were used rather than the original Hebrew recordings.

Track listing

LP 1
Side A
 Lys Assia with "Refrain" (Switzerland 1956) - 3:16
 Corry Brokken with "Net als toen" (The Netherlands 1957) - 3:23
 André Claveau with "Dors, mon amour" (France 1958) - 3:14
 Teddy Scholten with "Een beetje" (The Netherlands 1959) - 3:00
 Jacqueline Boyer with "Tom Pillibi" - (France 1960) - 3:04
 Jean-Claude Pascal with "Nous les amoureux" (Luxembourg 1961) - 3:06
 Isabelle Aubret with "Un premier amour" (France 1962) - 2:33

Side B 
 Grethe and Jørgen Ingmann with "Dansevise" (Denmark 1963) - 2:55
 Gigliola Cinquetti with "Non ho l'età" (Italy 1964) - 3:14
 France Gall with "Poupée de cire, poupée de son" (Luxembourg 1965) - 2:30
 Udo Jürgens with "Merci, Chérie" (Austria 1966) - 2:42
 Sandie Shaw with "Puppet on a String" (UK 1967) - 2:20
 Massiel with "La, la, la" (Spain 1968) - 2:31
 Salomé with "Vivo cantando" (Spain 1969) - 2:08

LP 2
Side A 
 Lulu with "Boom Bang-a-Bang" (UK 1969) - 2:21
 Lenny Kuhr with "De Troubadour" (The Netherlands 1969) - 3:36
 Frida Boccara with "Un jour, un enfant" (France 1969) - 2:42
 Dana with "All Kinds of Everything" (Ireland 1970)  - 3:00
 Séverine with "Un banc, un arbre, une rue" (Monaco 1971) - 3:01
 Vicky Leandros with "Après toi" (Luxembourg 1972) - 3:31
 Anne-Marie David with "Tu te reconnaîtras" (Luxembourg 1973) - 2:38

Side B 
 ABBA with "Waterloo" (Sweden 1974) - 2:45
 Teach-In with "Ding-a-dong" (Netherlands 1975) - 2:24
 Brotherhood of Man with "Save Your Kisses for Me" (UK 1976) - 3:05
 Marie Myriam with "L'oiseau et l'enfant" (France 1977) - 2:41
 Izhar Cohen and Alphabeta with "A-ba-ni-bi" (Israel 1978) - 2:56
 Milk and Honey with "Hallelujah" (Israel 1979) - 3:27
 Johnny Logan with "What's Another Year" (Ireland 1980) - 3:09
 Bucks Fizz with "Making Your Mind Up" (UK 1981) - 2:39

Release
The album was put together and released by Polydor, on behalf of the Red Cross. It was released all over Europe on double LP and cassette with various titles:

Scandinavia, Israel, Netherlands, Portugal, Spain, UK and Yugoslavia: Eurovision Gala: 29 Winners - 29 Worldsuccesses
France and French-speaking countries and territories: Grand Prix Eurovision de la Chanson: 29 winners - 29 successes
Germany and German-speaking countries and territories: Eurovision Gala: 29 Sieger - 29 Welterfolge

See also
Congratulations: 50 Years of the Eurovision Song Contest (2005)
Eurovision Song Contest's Greatest Hits (2015)
Eurovision: Europe Shine a Light (2020)

Notes

References

Television shows about the Eurovision Song Contest
Nostalgia television shows
1981 in Norwegian music
August 1981 events in Europe
Music events in Norway
Anniversaries